The Dargo Department (also Dargo) is a department or commune of Namentenga Province in northern Burkina Faso. Its capital lies at the town of Dargo.

Towns and villages
 Dargo (capital)

References

Departments of Burkina Faso
Namentenga Province